The 1987–88 Dallas Mavericks season was the eighth season of the franchise in the National Basketball Association (NBA).
The Mavericks finished second in the Midwest Division with a 53–29 record. They defeated the Houston Rockets four games in the first round of the 1988 NBA Playoffs, then defeated the 2nd-seeded Denver Nuggets six games in the semifinals. The Mavs made their first appearance in the Western Conference Finals, where they pushed the eventual-champion Los Angeles Lakers to seven games. The Mavs were coached by John MacLeod and played their home games at Reunion Arena.

Mark Aguirre and James Donaldson were both selected to play in the 1988 NBA All-Star Game in Chicago. This was Donaldson's only All-Star Game appearance in his career.

NBA Draft

Roster

Regular season

Standings

Record vs. opponents

Game log

|- align="center" bgcolor="#ccffcc"
| 1
| November 6, 19887:30 PM CST
| Utah
| W 95–93
|
|
|
| Reunion Arena17,007
| 1–0
|- align="center" bgcolor="#ffcccc"
| 2
| November 7, 1987
| @ San Antonio
| L 106–130
|
|
|
| HemisFair Arena
| 1–1
|- align="center" bgcolor="#ccffcc"
| 3
| November 10, 1987
| @ Seattle
| W 117–101
|
|
|
| Seattle Center Coliseum
| 2–1
|- align="center" bgcolor="#ffcccc"
| 4
| November 11, 19878:30 PM CST
| @ Utah
| L 92–121
|
|
|
| Salt Palace12,212
| 2–2
|- align="center" bgcolor="#ffcccc"
| 5
| November 13, 1987
| Seattle
| L 95–103
|
|
|
| Reunion Arena
| 2–3
|- align="center" bgcolor="#ccffcc"
| 6
| November 14, 1987
| Portland
| W 127–116
|
|
|
| Reunion Arena
| 3–3
|- align="center" bgcolor="#ccffcc"
| 7
| November 18, 1987
| L.A. Clippers
| W 97–87
|
|
|
| Reunion Arena
| 4–3
|- align="center" bgcolor="#ffcccc"
| 8
| November 20, 19879:30 PM CST
| @ L.A. Lakers
| L 116–119
| Aguirre (35)
| Blackman (7)
| Davis (8)
| The Forum17,505
| 4–4
|- align="center" bgcolor="#ccffcc"
| 9
| November 21, 1987
| @ Sacramento
| W 103–96
|
|
|
| ARCO Arena
| 5–4
|- align="center" bgcolor="#ccffcc"
| 10
| November 25, 19877:30 PM CST
| Detroit
| W 113–107
| Blackman (30)
| Perkins (12)
| Harper (10)
| Reunion Arena17,007
| 6–4
|- align="center" bgcolor="#ccffcc"
| 11
| November 27, 19877:00 PM CST
| Chicago
| W 94–93
|
|
|
| Reunion Arena17,007
| 7–4
|- align="center" bgcolor="#ffcccc"
| 12
| November 28, 19878:30 PM CST
| @ Denver
| L 98–106
|
|
|
| McNichols Sports Arena13,400
| 7–5

|- align="center" bgcolor="#ccffcc"
| 13
| December 4, 1987
| Golden State
| W 116–95
|
|
|
| Reunion Arena
| 8–5
|- align="center" bgcolor="#ccffcc"
| 14
| December 5, 19877:30 PM CST
| Denver
| W 109–96
|
|
|
| Reunion Arena17,007
| 9–5
|- align="center" bgcolor="#ccffcc"
| 15
| December 9, 1987
| Sacramento
| W 125–98
|
|
|
| Reunion Arena
| 10–5
|- align="center" bgcolor="#ccffcc"
| 16
| December 11, 1987
| Phoenix
| W 108–104
|
|
|
| Reunion Arena
| 11–5
|- align="center" bgcolor="#ccffcc"
| 17
| December 13, 19877:30 PM CST
| @ Milwaukee
| W 113–99
|
|
|
| MECCA Arena11,052
| 12–5
|- align="center" bgcolor="#ffcccc"
| 18
| December 15, 19876:30 PM CST
| @ Cleveland
| L 93–106
|
|
|
| Richfield Coliseum6,852
| 12–6
|- align="center" bgcolor="#ccffcc"
| 19
| December 16, 1987
| @ New Jersey
| W 109–105 (OT)
|
|
|
| Brendan Byrne Arena
| 13–6
|- align="center" bgcolor="#ffcccc"
| 20
| December 18, 19876:30 PM CST
| @ Detroit
| L 112–117
| Aguirre (35)
| Donaldson (12)
| Harper (7)
| Pontiac Silverdome19,426
| 13–7
|- align="center" bgcolor="#ffcccc"
| 21
| December 19, 1987
| @ Philadelphia
| L 90–95
|
|
|
| The Spectrum
| 13–8
|- align="center" bgcolor="#ccffcc"
| 22
| December 22, 19877:00 PM CST
| @ Chicago
| W 111–100
|
|
|
| Chicago Stadium18,103
| 14–8
|- align="center" bgcolor="#ccffcc"
| 23
| December 23, 1987
| @ Indiana
| W 110–109
|
|
|
| Market Square Arena
| 15–8
|- align="center" bgcolor="#ccffcc"
| 24
| December 26, 1987
| Houston
| W 105–100
|
|
|
| Reunion Arena
| 16–8
|- align="center" bgcolor="#ccffcc"
| 25
| December 29, 1987
| Sacramento
| W 126–117
|
|
|
| Reunion Arena
| 17–8

|- align="center" bgcolor="#ccffcc"
| 26
| January 2, 1988
| @ San Antonio
| W 116–109
|
|
|
| HemisFair Arena
| 18–8
|- align="center" bgcolor="#ffcccc"
| 27
| January 4, 1988
| @ Houston
| L 107–117
|
|
|
| The Summit
| 18–9
|- align="center" bgcolor="#ffcccc"
| 28
| January 6, 19889:30 PM CST
| @ L.A. Lakers
| L 89–103
| Aguirre (29)
| Donaldson (12)
| Harper (11)
| The Forum17,505
| 18–10
|- align="center" bgcolor="#ccffcc"
| 29
| January 7, 1988
| @ Phoenix
| W 105–91
|
|
|
| Arizona Veterans Memorial Coliseum
| 19–10
|- align="center" bgcolor="#ccffcc"
| 30
| January 9, 1988
| @ Golden State
| W 115–99
|
|
|
| Oakland–Alameda County Coliseum Arena
| 20–10
|- align="center" bgcolor="#ccffcc"
| 31
| January 13, 1988
| Indiana
| W 110–108
|
|
|
| Reunion Arena
| 21–10
|- align="center" bgcolor="#ffcccc"
| 32
| January 16, 198812:30 PM CST
| Atlanta
| L 98–101
|
|
|
| Reunion Arena17,007
| 21–11
|- align="center" bgcolor="#ccffcc"
| 33
| January 18, 19889:30 PM CST
| @ L.A. Clippers
| W 99–87
|
|
|
| Los Angeles Memorial Sports Arena
| 22–11
|- align="center" bgcolor="#ccffcc"
| 34
| January 19, 1988
| @ Portland
| W 120–116
|
|
|
| Memorial Coliseum
| 23–11
|- align="center" bgcolor="#ccffcc"
| 35
| January 22, 1988
| L.A. Clippers
| W 110–87
|
|
|
| Reunion Arena
| 24–11
|- align="center" bgcolor="#ccffcc"
| 36
| January 23, 19887:30 PM CST
| Milwaukee
| W 113–97
|
|
|
| Reunion Arena17,007
| 25–11
|- align="center" bgcolor="#ccffcc"
| 37
| January 26, 1988
| San Antonio
| W 128–111
|
|
|
| Reunion Arena
| 26–11
|- align="center" bgcolor="#ccffcc"
| 38
| January 27, 1988
| @ Phoenix
| W 121–102
|
|
|
| Arizona Veterans Memorial Coliseum
| 27–11
|- align="center" bgcolor="#ccffcc"
| 39
| January 29, 1988
| Seattle
| W 117–109
|
|
|
| Reunion Arena
| 28–11
|- align="center" bgcolor="#ffcccc"
| 40
| January 30, 1988
| Houston
| L 92–108
|
|
|
| Reunion Arena
| 28–12

|- align="center" bgcolor="#ffcccc"
| 41
| February 1, 1988
| New Jersey
| L 103–108
|
|
|
| Reunion Arena
| 28–13
|- align="center" bgcolor="#ffcccc"
| 42
| February 3, 19888:30 PM CST
| @ Denver
| L 105–115
|
|
|
| McNichols Sports Arena10,667
| 28–14
|- align="center" bgcolor="#ffcccc"
| 43
| February 4, 1988
| @ Sacramento
| L 101–118
|
|
|
| ARCO Arena
| 28–15
|- align="center" bgcolor="#ccffcc"
| 44
| February 9, 19887:00 PM CST
| Utah
| W 124–93
|
|
|
| Reunion Arena17,007
| 29–15
|- align="center" bgcolor="#ffcccc"
| 45
| February 10, 19888:30 PM CST
| @ Utah
| L 80–93
|
|
|
| Salt Palace12,444
| 29–16
|- align="center" bgcolor="#ffcccc"
| 46
| February 12, 19887:30 PM CST
| Boston
| L 104–105
|
|
|
| Reunion Arena17,007
| 29–17
|- align="center" bgcolor="#ccffcc"
| 47
| February 14, 1988
| @ L.A. Clippers
| W 110–100
|
|
|
| Los Angeles Memorial Sports Arena
| 30–17
|- align="center" bgcolor="#ccffcc"
| 48
| February 15, 1988
| @ Seattle
| W 128–122 (2OT)
|
|
|
| Seattle Center Coliseum
| 31–17
|- align="center" bgcolor="#ccffcc"
| 49
| February 17, 19887:30 PM CST
| Washington
| W 123–108
|
|
|
| Reunion Arena17,007
| 32–17
|- align="center" bgcolor="#ccffcc"
| 50
| February 19, 19887:30 PM CST
| Golden State
| W 113–100
|
|
|
| Reunion Arena
| 33–17
|- align="center" bgcolor="#ccffcc"
| 51
| February 22, 19887:30 PM CST
| Phoenix
| W 114–107
|
|
|
| Reunion Arena
| 34–17
|- align="center" bgcolor="#ccffcc"
| 52
| February 24, 19887:30 PM CST
| Cleveland
| W 93–89
|
|
|
| Reunion Arena17,007
| 35–17
|- align="center" bgcolor="#ccffcc"
| 53
| February 25, 1988
| @ Houston
| W 108–106
|
|
|
| The Summit
| 36–17
|- align="center" bgcolor="#ccffcc"
| 54
| February 27, 1988
| Philadelphia
| W 100–91
|
|
|
| Reunion Arena
| 37–17
|- align="center" bgcolor="#ccffcc"
| 55
| February 29, 19887:30 PM CST
| Denver
| W 123–96
|
|
|
| Reunion Arena17,007
| 38–17

|- align="center" bgcolor="#ccffcc"
| 56
| March 2, 1988
| Sacramento
| W 115–90
|
|
|
| Reunion Arena
| 39–17
|- align="center" bgcolor="#ccffcc"
| 57
| March 4, 19887:00 PM CST
| Houston
| W 118–110
|
|
|
| Reunion Arena
| 40–17
|- align="center" bgcolor="#ffcccc"
| 58
| March 6, 19881:00 PM CST
| L.A. Lakers
| L 97–108
| Aguirre (27)
| Donaldson (12)
| Davis & Harper (6)
| Reunion Arena17,007
| 40–18
|- align="center" bgcolor="#ffcccc"
| 59
| March 8, 1988
| Portland
| L 110–112
|
|
|
| Reunion Arena
| 41–19
|- align="center" bgcolor="#ccffcc"
| 60
| March 12, 198810:00 PM CST
| @ L.A. Lakers
| W 110–101
| Aguirre (21)
| Tarpley (21)
| Aguirre & Davis (5)
| The Forum17,505
| 41–19
|- align="center" bgcolor="#ccffcc"
| 61
| March 14, 1988
| Golden State
| W 121–101
|
|
|
| Reunion Arena
| 42–19
|- align="center" bgcolor="#ffcccc"
| 62
| March 16, 19888:30 PM CST
| @ Utah
| L 105–120
|
|
|
| Salt Palace12,444
| 42–20
|- align="center" bgcolor="#ccffcc"
| 63
| March 18, 1988
| @ L.A. Clippers
| W 106–98
|
|
|
| Los Angeles Memorial Sports Arena
| 43–20
|- align="center" bgcolor="#ffcccc"
| 64
| March 20, 1988
| @ Portland
| L 99–105
|
|
|
| Memorial Coliseum
| 43–21
|- align="center" bgcolor="#ccffcc"
| 65
| March 22, 19887:30 PM CST
| New York
| W 124–105
|
|
|
| Reunion Arena
| 44–21
|- align="center" bgcolor="#ccffcc"
| 66
| March 25, 1988
| Portland
| W 106–101
|
|
|
| Reunion Arena
| 45–21
|- align="center" bgcolor="#ccffcc"
| 67
| March 26, 1988
| San Antonio
| W 131–112
|
|
|
| Reunion Arena
| 46–21
|- align="center" bgcolor="#ffcccc"
| 68
| March 28, 19886:30 PM CST
| @ New York
| L 106–114
|
|
|
| Madison Square Garden
| 46–22
|- align="center" bgcolor="#ffcccc"
| 69
| March 29, 19887:00 PM CST
| @ Atlanta
| L 106–120
|
|
|
| The Omni14,583
| 46–23

|- align="center" bgcolor="#ffcccc"
| 70
| April 1, 19887:00 PM CST
| @ Washington
| L 113–128
|
|
|
| Capital Centre13,783
| 46–24
|- align="center" bgcolor="#ffcccc"
| 71
| April 3, 198812 Noon CDT
| @ Boston
| L 101–110
|
|
|
| Boston Garden14,890
| 46–25
|- align="center" bgcolor="#ccffcc"
| 72
| April 6, 1988
| Phoenix
| W 119–93
|
|
|
| Reunion Arena
| 47–25
|- align="center" bgcolor="#ccffcc"
| 73
| April 8, 19887:30 PM CDT
| Utah
| W 118–95
|
|
|
| Reunion Arena17,007
| 48–25
|- align="center" bgcolor="#ccffcc"
| 74
| April 9, 19887:30 PM CDT
| Denver
| W 135–109
|
|
|
| Reunion Arena17,007
| 49–25
|- align="center" bgcolor="#ccffcc"
| 75
| April 12, 1988
| @ Sacramento
| W 104–96
|
|
|
| ARCO Arena
| 50–25
|- align="center" bgcolor="#ffcccc"
| 76
| April 13, 1988
| @ Golden State
| L 110–112
|
|
|
| Oakland–Alameda County Coliseum Arena
| 50–26
|- align="center" bgcolor="#ffcccc"
| 77
| April 15, 1988
| @ Seattle
| L 88–115
|
|
|
| Seattle Center Coliseum
| 50–27
|- align="center" bgcolor="#ffcccc"
| 78
| April 17, 19883:00 PM CDT
| @ Denver
| L 122–133
|
|
|
| McNichols Sports Arena17,022
| 50–28
|- align="center" bgcolor="#ccffcc"
| 79
| April 19, 19887:30 PM CDT
| @ Houston
| W 104–96
|
|
|
| The Summit
| 51–28
|- align="center" bgcolor="#ffcccc"
| 80
| April 20, 19887:30 PM CDT
| L.A. Lakers
| L 107–114
| Tarpley (24)
| Tarpley (13)
| Blackman (7)
| Reunion Arena17,007
| 51–29
|- align="center" bgcolor="#ccffcc"
| 81
| April 22, 1988
| San Antonio
| W 127–96
|
|
|
| Reunion Arena
| 52–29
|- align="center" bgcolor="#ccffcc"
| 82
| April 24, 1988
| @ San Antonio
| W 119–109
|
|
|
| HemisFair Arena
| 53–29

Playoffs

Game log

|- align="center" bgcolor="#ccffcc"
| 1
| April 28, 19887:30 PM CDT
| Houston
| W 120–110
| Roy Tarpley (24)
| Roy Tarpley (9)
| Derek Harper (8)
| Reunion Arena17,007
| 1–0
|- align="center" bgcolor="#ffcccc"
| 2
| April 30, 19882:30 PM CDT
| Houston
| L 108–119
| Roy Tarpley (23)
| Roy Tarpley (13)
| Derek Harper (8)
| Reunion Arena17,007
| 1–1
|- align="center" bgcolor="#ccffcc"
| 3
| May 3, 19887:30 PM CDT
| @ Houston
| W 93–92
| Roy Tarpley (17)
| Roy Tarpley (13)
| Rolando Blackman (7)
| The Summit16,611
| 2–1
|- align="center" bgcolor="#ccffcc"
| 4
| May 5, 19887:00 PM CDT
| @ Houston
| W 107–97
| Mark Aguirre (38)
| James Donaldson (10)
| Rolando Blackman (10)
| The Summit16,611
| 3–1
|-

|- align="center" bgcolor="#ffcccc"
| 1
| May 10, 19888:30 PM CDT
| @ Denver
| L 115–126
| Mark Aguirre (26)
| James Donaldson (13)
| Derek Harper (5)
| McNichols Sports Arena17,022
| 0–1
|- align="center" bgcolor="#ccffcc"
| 2
| May 12, 19889:00 PM CDT
| @ Denver
| W 112–108
| Rolando Blackman (31)
| James Donaldson (13)
| Derek Harper (8)
| McNichols Sports Arena17,022
| 1–1
|- align="center" bgcolor="#ffcccc"
| 3
| May 14, 19882:30 PM CDT
| Denver
| L 105–107
| Sam Perkins (17)
| Roy Tarpley (15)
| Mark Aguirre (6)
| Reunion Arena17,007
| 1–2
|- align="center" bgcolor="#ccffcc"
| 4
| May 15, 19887:00 PM CDT
| Denver
| W 124–103
| Mark Aguirre (34)
| Roy Tarpley (13)
| Derek Harper (10)
| Reunion Arena17,007
| 2–2
|- align="center" bgcolor="#ccffcc"
| 5
| May 17, 19889:00 PM CDT
| @ Denver
| W 110–106
| Mark Aguirre (25)
| Roy Tarpley (16)
| Derek Harper (6)
| McNichols Sports Arena17,022
| 3–2
|- align="center" bgcolor="#ccffcc"
| 6
| May 19, 19887:00 PM CDT
| Denver
| W 108–95
| Blackman, Perkins (23)
| Roy Tarpley (19)
| Derek Harper (9)
| Reunion Arena17,007
| 4–2
|-

|- align="center" bgcolor="#ffcccc"
| 1
| May 23, 19889:30 PM CDT
| @ L.A. Lakers
| L 98–113
| three players tied (18)
| Tarpley (20)
| Harper (7)
| The Forum17,505
| 0–1
|- align="center" bgcolor="#ffcccc"
| 2
| May 25, 19889:30 PM CDT
| @ L.A. Lakers
| L 101–123
| Aguirre (28)
| Tarpley (13)
| Harper (8)
| The Forum17,505
| 0–2
|- align="center" bgcolor="#ccffcc"
| 3
| May 27, 19887:00 PM CDT
| L.A. Lakers
| W 106–94
| Aguirre (23)
| Tarpley (20)
| Davis (6)
| Reunion Arena17,007
| 1–2
|- align="center" bgcolor="#ccffcc"
| 4
| May 29, 19882:30 PM CDT
| L.A. Lakers
| W 118–104
| Harper (35)
| Tarpley (13)
| Blackman (11)
| Reunion Arena17,007
| 2–2
|- align="center" bgcolor="#ffcccc"
| 5
| May 31, 198810:30 PM CDT
| @ L.A. Lakers
| L 102–119
| Aguirre (31)
| Tarpley (11)
| Harper (6)
| The Forum17,505
| 2–3
|- align="center" bgcolor="#ccffcc"
| 6
| June 2, 19888:00 PM CDT
| L.A. Lakers
| W 105–103
| Aguirre (23)
| Aguirre (13)
| Harper (10)
| Reunion Arena17,007
| 3–3
|- align="center" bgcolor="#ffcccc"
| 7
| June 4, 19882:30 PM CDT
| @ L.A. Lakers
| L 102–117
| Aguirre (24)
| Donaldson (14)
| Harper (11)
| The Forum17,505
| 3–4
|-

Awards and honors

Week/Month
 Roy Tarpley was named Player of the Week for games played February 22 through February 28.

All-Star
 Mark Aguirre was selected as a reserve for the Western Conference in the All-Star Game. It was his third All-Star selection. Aguirre finished seventh in voting among Western Conference forwards with 347,357 votes.
 James Donaldson was selected as a reserve for the Western Conference in the All-Star Game. It was his first and only All-Star selection. Donaldson finished fourth in voting among Western Conference centers with 310,100 votes.
 Detlef Schrempf was selected to compete in the Three-Point Shootout.  Schrempf was eliminated in the second round.

Season
 Roy Tarpley received the Sixth Man of the Year Award.
 Mark Aguirre finished 14th in MVP voting.

Player statistics

Season

† – Minimum 25 three-pointers made.
^ – Minimum 125 free throws made.

Playoffs

^ – Minimum 10 free throws made.

Transactions

Free agents

Subtractions

References

Dallas Mavericks seasons
Dallas
Dallas
Dallas